Amblyseius guntheri is a species of mite in the family Phytoseiidae.

References

guntheri
Articles created by Qbugbot
Animals described in 1987